Eremopterix is the genus of sparrow-larks, songbirds in the family Alaudidae. The sparrow-larks are found from Africa to the Indian subcontinent.

Taxonomy and systematics

Extant species
The genus Eremopterix contains the following extant species:

Former species
Formerly, some authorities also considered the following species (or subspecies) as species within the genus Eremopterix:
 Arabian Dunn's lark (as Pyrrhulauda eremodites)

References 

 
Bird genera
Taxonomy articles created by Polbot